Max Irving (born 21 May 1995) is an American water polo player. He competed in the 2020 Summer Olympics.

References

External links
 UCLA Bruins bio

1995 births
Living people
Sportspeople from Long Beach, California
Olympiacos Water Polo Club players
Water polo players at the 2020 Summer Olympics
American male water polo players
Olympic water polo players of the United States
UCLA Bruins men's water polo players
Pan American Games medalists in water polo
Pan American Games gold medalists for the United States
Water polo players at the 2019 Pan American Games
Medalists at the 2019 Pan American Games